Ramachandran Ragupathy (born 12 May 1996) is an Indian cricketer. He made his first-class debut on 12 February 2020, for Puducherry in the 2019–20 Ranji Trophy. He made his List A debut on 1 March 2021, for Puducherry in the 2020–21 Vijay Hazare Trophy. He made his Twenty20 debut on 5 November 2021, for Puducherry in the 2021–22 Syed Mushtaq Ali Trophy.

References

External links
 

1996 births
Living people
Indian cricketers
Pondicherry cricketers
Place of birth missing (living people)